Herman Hasanusi (born May 17, 1956) is the mayor of Bandar Lampung, the third most populated city in Sumatra and the capital of Lampung province. He was first elected in 2010 and was re-elected in 2015.

Personal life
He was born in the Pagar Dewa subdistrict of Tulang Bawang from parents Hasanusi and Ratu Pesayan. After finishing elementary school, his family moved to Bandar Lampung where Hasanusi continued his studies. His most recent degree was a masters in Management from Bandar Lampung University.

He married Eva Dwiana and the couple has 4 children.

Career
He started his work as a civil servant in 1977 until 2010, serving in various finance-related positions including the head of the investment board, finance bureau and the department of regional incomes.

As mayor
In 2010, he ran as a mayoral candidate and was elected with 33 percent of the votes in the 6-candidate race. His programs included providing free healthcare and education to the city's inhabitants. He was reelected in the 2015 elections with a landslide victory, gaining 358,254 votes (86.66%).

In 2014, he participated in Lampung's gubernatorial election, and won 1,342,763 votes (33.12%), placing second behind Muhammad Ridho Ficardo. He once more participated in the 2018 gubernatorial elections for the province, where among other candidates he ran against Ficardo.

References

Living people
1956 births
Mayors of places in Indonesia
People from Bandar Lampung
People from Lampung
Lampung people